"Fukk Sleep" is a song by American rapper ASAP Rocky featuring English singer FKA Twigs from the former's third studio album, Testing (2018). Produced by Hector Delgado, FnZ, Boi-1da, and Rocky (under the name Lord Flacko), the track was released in 2018 alongside the album. The song was later given a video, directed by Diana Kunst.

Background
The song contains a sample of "FYM", written by Prodigy, Joyner Lucas, Boi-1da and Mystikal, as performed by Lucas. The song's writing credits reflect this, with Twigs and Rocky, as well as Michael Burman, Hector Delgado, Prodigy, Lucas, Boi-1da, and Mystikal being credited as writers. The song was produced by Delgado, Rocky, FnZ, and Boi-1da. Delgado provided background vocals and engineered and mixed the song. The song features keyboards by Andrew VanWyngarden.

Promotion

Music video
Directed by Diana Kunst, the visual sees "Twigs and Rocky serve all of the looks while causing mayhem in the streets and then taking it elsewhere from a fancy restaurant to a grungy strip club." The video's production was handled by Object Animal and O Creative Studio.

The duo wore clothes designed by a range of high-fashion outlets such as Calvin Klein, Alexander Wang, Dior, and Versace, among others. Since its premiere on November 2, 2018, the video has received over 30 million views. Fellow rapper Kanye West praised the video on his Twitter. Tosten Burks of Spin likened the video to the film Blade Runner.

Live performances
The duo performed the song at Redbull's Music Festival in May 2019. Following the performance, Trace William Owen of Complex magazine praised the performance and said "[audiences] don't talk enough about 'Fukk Sleep'".

Charts

Certifications

References

2018 songs
ASAP Rocky songs
FKA Twigs songs
Songs written by ASAP Rocky
Songs written by Prodigy (rapper)
Songs written by Joyner Lucas
Songs written by Boi-1da
Songs written by Mystikal
Song recordings produced by Boi-1da
Experimental hip hop songs